Hassaku orange (also called  "jagada",) is Japanese citrus hybrid similar to an orange in color but with the size of a grapefruit.

The original plant was discovered near the Jōdo Temple in Inno-shima, Hiroshima prefecture, Japan.

Cultivation and uses 
The Japanese eat the 'Hassaku' as an orange, but it can be eaten with a grapefruit spoon to avoid the bitterness of the residual albedo. It is much more tart than an orange, but it does not lack sweetness entirely. When bitten into, juice bursts into the mouth from a slice of this fruit, considered very pleasant.

In 2010, 68% of Japan's 35,919-ton 'hassaku' harvest came from Wakayama, with the remainder mainly grown in Hiroshima, Ehime and Tokushima Prefectures.

The fruit is mostly eaten raw, because, when cooked, it becomes more bitter. Currently, the idea of using ion-exchange resin is being suggested as a way to remove the bitterness, and so make it possible to commercialize the juice. Nutritionally, the fruit is a good source of vitamin C, folic acid, potassium and fiber.

Several populations of the trees were infested with Citrus tristeza virus which caused stunted growth and destroyed the harvest after 10–15 years.

An extraction from the young fruits have been used medically in skin care treatments for patients with atopic dermatitis.

Others 
Hassa-kun is a local mascot character which represents Inno-shima in Hiroshima prefecture to enhance image and promote tourism.

References

Citrus Variety Collection
Sightseeing, tourist guide

External links
You tube

Oranges (fruit)
Japanese fruit